The Serpulaceae are a family of fungi in the Boletales order. According to the Dictionary of the Fungi (10th edition, 2008), the family contains 4 genera and 20 species. However, a molecular phylogenetics study showed that the genus Neopaxillus, which was formerly placed in this family, belongs in the family Crepidotaceae in the order Agaricales.

References

Boletales
Basidiomycota families